Samuel Merritt University (SMU) is a private university focused on health sciences and located on the Summit campus of the Alta Bates Summit Medical Center in Oakland, California. It was an affiliate of the Sutter Health Network and Alta Bates Summit Medical Center until becoming a wholly independent institution in January, 2022, upon its disaffiliation from Sutter Health. It is the only provider of physical therapists, occupational therapists, and physician assistants and is the largest source of nurses in the greater East Bay. Formerly known as Samuel Merritt College, it was founded in 1909 as a hospital school of nursing.

History 
Samuel Merritt University was founded in 1909 through the legacy of Dr. Samuel Merritt. 

In recent years, Samuel Merritt has increased its enrollment from 146 to over 2,000 graduate and undergraduate students and added new programs in the health sciences.

The Intercollegiate Nursing Program with Saint Mary's was established in 1981. Samuel Merritt College established the entry-level Master of Physical Therapy in 1990, the Master of Occupational Therapy in 1992. The College also offers a Master of Science in Nursing three advanced nursing specialties: Case Management, Family nurse practitioner (FNP), and Nurse Anesthesia (CRNA). In 2005, the department of Physical Therapy graduated its first Doctor of Physical Therapy class.

The university started the Master Physician Assistant program in 1999, the first entry-level graduate program for physician assistants in California, and in 2002 established the California School of Podiatric Medicine Samuel Merritt University is listed as "unranked" by U.S. News & World Report Best Colleges Ranking.

Academics

Programs 
SMU is a university dedicated to health sciences. Most of the university's programs are at the graduate level; however, the College of Nursing offers two bachelor's degree programs. Podiatric medicine, physical therapy, occupational therapy, and nursing practice are all offered at the doctoral level while the physician assistant program is offered at the master's level. The university's average graduation rate is 95 percent and student scores on licensure pass rates are 90 percent or above for first-time test takers in six programs.

Accreditation 
The university is accredited by the WASC Senior College and University Commission (WSCUC) and its programs are accredited by their corresponding accreditation bodies.

References

External links
 

Educational institutions established in 1909
Education in Oakland, California
Nursing schools in California
Podiatric medical schools in the United States
Universities and colleges in Alameda County, California
Schools accredited by the Western Association of Schools and Colleges
1909 establishments in California
Private universities and colleges in California